Ernst Höfner (born 21 September 1957) is a German ice hockey player. He competed in the men's tournaments at the 1980 Winter Olympics and the 1984 Winter Olympics.

References

1957 births
Living people
German ice hockey players
Olympic ice hockey players of West Germany
Ice hockey players at the 1980 Winter Olympics
Ice hockey players at the 1984 Winter Olympics
Sportspeople from Augsburg
Starbulls Rosenheim players